Anthony Walters (born September 19, 1988) is an American football free safety who is currently a free agent. He was signed by the Chicago Bears as an undrafted free agent on July 26, 2011. He played college football for Delaware.

He also played for the Arizona Cardinals.

College career
Walters played at Delaware, and played in all 50 games he appeared in, recording 258 tackles, 12 tackles for losses, one sack, 16 interceptions, and 31 passes broken up. Walters ranks second all-time in school history in pass breakups and fourth in interceptions.

Professional career

Chicago Bears
After being signed by the Bears, Walters spent the first five weeks on the practice squad, and was elevated on October 11 after Winston Venable was released. However, on November 16, Walters was placed on injured reserve after sustaining a hamstring injury. In the third game of the 2012 preseason against the New York Giants, Walters tipped a David Carr pass to teammate Isaiah Frey with 1:06 left in the game, giving the Bears a 20-17 victory. In Week 15 against the Green Bay Packers, Walters recovered a fumbled lateral, but the Bears failed to capitalize on the recovery, and the Bears lost 21-13. Walters made his first career start in Week 17 against the Detroit Lions after an injury to Chris Conte. In 2013, Walters ranked fifth among Bears players in special teams tackles with 10. Walters became a restricted free agent after the 2013 season.

Arizona Cardinals
On May 14, 2014, Walters signed a one-year deal with the Arizona Cardinals. The Cardinals released Walters on August 30, 2014.

Second stint with the Bears
On November 29, 2014, Walters was brought back by the Bears, playing in the final four games of the season. He was released on April 2, 2015.

Second stint with the Cardinals
On August 18, 2015, Walters was signed by the Cardinals. On September 5, 2015, he was released by the Cardinals.

References

External links
 Chicago Bears bio
 Delaware Blue Hens bio
 Rivals page

1988 births
Living people
Players of American football from Philadelphia
American football safeties
Delaware Fightin' Blue Hens football players
Chicago Bears players
Arizona Cardinals players